Juan Arricivita was a Catholic missionary.

He was a native of Mexico in the eighteenth century. Little more is known of his life than that he was Prefect and Commissary of the College of Propaganda Fide, at Querétaro, in New Spain (Mexico), a zealous and efficient missionary, and a highly esteemed member of the Franciscan Order. He deserves special mention as having been the author of the second volume of the Chronicles of Querétaro (for first part see Isidro Felis Espinosa), a book that is of inestimable value for the history of missions and colonization of northwestern Mexico, including the modern-day U.S. states of Arizona and California.

See also

References

Mexican Roman Catholic missionaries
18th-century Mexican people
Mexican Franciscans
Mexican Roman Catholic priests

Roman Catholic missionaries in Mexico
Roman Catholic missionaries in New Spain